The 1955 Rhode Island Rams football team was an American football team that represented the University of Rhode Island as a member of the Yankee Conference during the 1955 college football season. In its fifth season under head coach Hal Kopp, the team compiled a 6–1–2 record (4–0–1 against conference opponents), won the Yankee Conference championship, lost to Jacksonville State in the Refrigerator Bowl, and outscored all opponents by a total of 162 to 67. The team played its home games at Meade Stadium in Kingston, Rhode Island.

Schedule

References

Rhode Island State
Rhode Island Rams football seasons
Yankee Conference football champion seasons
Rhode Island State Rams football